Antonio González Iturbe  (born 7 March 1967, Zaragoza) is a Spanish journalist, writer and professor. He is the director of the cultural magazine Librújula.

Biography

Early years and education
Born in Zaragoza, his family moved to Barcelona and Iturbe grew up in the Barceloneta neighbourhood. He pursued a bachelor's degree in journalism at the Universidad Autónoma de Barcelona, where he graduated in 1991. He balanced his studies with several jobs: parking guard, baker, and an auditor. His first job as a journalist, was in a local Barcelona television show,  Televisió de Ciutat Vella, where he worked as a reporter.

Magazine
After graduating, he created the free magazine Gratix, which he directed and, after taking part in various short media projects, in 1993 got into being the chief supervisor of the supplement television of El Periódico. Subsequently, he became editor of cinema-magazine Fantastic Magazine.

In 1996, he was involved in the emerging book magazine Que Leer, in which he held the position of chief editor, deputy director and, since 2008, director. Throughout these years Iturbe also took part, among many media endeavours, such as the magazine Fotogramas, the book section of Protagonistas in the national radio broadcaster Onda Cero, or in cultural divulgation for Ona Catalana, Icat FM or La Cope de Bilbao, and in cultural supplements for journals La Vanguardia and Avui.

Novels
In 2004, he published his first novel: Rectos torcidos. A humorous novel where the protagonist, a Barceloneta neighbour, starts up his own unique business: To transform Don Quixote and other literature classics into toilet paper to read them in the only place where people have their five minutes of peace a day. In the highest days of Barcelona’s economy he already bitterly criticised the changes Barcelona as a city was undergoing to become a theme park for tourism. In 2008 he published the first title of the children’s book series Los casos del inspector Cito, illustrated by Álex Omist. A police series with plenty of humor in a way for the youngest to get into their firsts police novels. Los casos del inspector Cito is a collection currently made of 10 books and has been translated into nine languages.

In 2012, he published his third novel La bibliotecaria de Auschwitz which was translated into English under the title The Librarian of Auschwitz. The novel was inspired by the life of Dita Kraus, a survivor of Auschwitz, who at the age of 14 took charge of a clandestine library in the barracks Bllb of the Auschwitz concentration camp. This novel has been translated into at least 13 languages. The novel was awarded the Troa Prize in 2013.

In 2014, Iturbe started a new children's literature series: La Isla de Susú, which is currently at its fourth book into the series, it has also been translated to Korean. In 2017, he published A cielo abierto about the lives of pioneering French air mail pilots Antoine de Saint-Exupéry (best known as the author of The Little Prince), Jean Mermoz and Henri Guillaumet. To date the novel has been translated into six languages; including into English, as The Prince of the Skies. The novel was awarded the Premio Biblioteca Breve in 2017.

Professor
During these years Iturbe has also been a postgraduate professor at the Master of Cultural Journalism at the Universidad Autónoma de Madrid and the Master of Edition at the Universidad Autónoma de Barcelona. He has given lectures as a guest-professor in the faculties of Journalism at the Universidad Blanquerna, Universitat Oberta de Catalunya and at the Universitad Abat Oliba. 

He has belonged to the committee of the selection Bibliotecas de Barcelona and has been honoured President of the Association of Cultural Journalists of Catalonia. In Zaragoza, he has been the at the panel experts in the Asociación Miguel Fleta.

Bibliography

Children's literature 

Los casos del inspector Cito y Chin Mi Edo (Edebé)
 Un ayudante de mucha ayuda, 2008 
 El caso de la momia desaparecida, 2008 
 El visitante nocturno, 2009 
 Un día en las carreras, 2009 
 Una investigación por los pelos, 2010 
 Misterio en el mundial de Fútbol, 2010 
 Año nuevo en China, 2011
 Intriga en la fábrica de paraguas,  2011
 Un misterio muy magnético, 2012 
 Pásalo de miedo (especial misterio) 2012 
 Un jardín en el fondo del mar, 2014
 ¡Silencio, se rueda!, 2014
 Que vienen los turistas, 2015

La isla de Susú (Edebé)
 Un jardín en el fondo del mar
 ¡Silencio, se rueda!
 ¡Que vienen los turistas!
 Un secreto en el aire, 2015

Novels 
 Rectos torcidos, 2005 (Planeta). 
 Días de sal,  2008 (Ed. La otra orilla)
 La bibliotecaria de Auschwitz, 2012 (Planeta). 
 Trans. The Librarian of Auschwitz, 2017 (Farrar, Straus & Giroux). 
 Trans. Rus "Хранительница книг из Аушвица"'2020 (Popcorn Books)
 Narrando desde el Greco, 2014 (Lunwerg) collaborative
 A cielo abierto, 2017 (Seix Barral)
 Trans. The Prince of the Skies, 2021 (MacMillan). 
 Trans. Rus "В открытое небо", 2021 (Popcorn Books)
 Trans. La bibliothécaire d'Auschwitz,  2021 (J'ai lu )
La playa infinita, 2021 (Seix Barral)

References

External links 
In Spanish:

Portal cultural: Librújula
Sitio Web oficial Antonio Iturbe
Perfil de escritor en 'Planeta Libros'
<<El zaragozano Antonio Iturbe, premio Troa por 'La bibliotecaria de Auschwitz'>> (El Heraldo)
<<Antonio Iturbe, Premio Biblioteca Breve con una novela sobre Antoine de Saint-Exupéry>> (Diario ABC)
Vídeos sobre Antonio Iturbe

1967 births
Living people
Spanish novelists
Spanish male novelists
Autonomous University of Barcelona alumni